Melaleuca subfalcata is a shrub in the myrtle family Myrtaceae, and is endemic to the south of Western Australia. It has fibrous bark and pink to purple flowers in spikes, mostly on the side branches.

Description

The flowers are a shade of pink to purple, arranged in a spike on the sides of the branches and sometimes on the ends of branches that continue to grow after flowering. The stamens are arranged in five bundles around the flower, each bundle with 11 to 22 stamens.

Taxonomy and naming
Melaleuca subfalcata was first formally described in 1847 by Nikolai Turczaninow in "Bulletin de la classe physico-mathematique de l'Academie Imperiale des sciences de Saint-Petersburg". The specific epithet (subfalcata) is from the Latin word falcatus meaning "curved" or "sickle-shaped" and the prefix -sub meaning “under” in reference to the leaves being curved, almost like a sickle.

Distribution and habitat
This melaleuca occurs in and between the Ongerup, Lake King and Israelite Bay districts in the Esperance Plains, Jarrah Forest and Mallee biogeographic regions. It grows in sand or clay over laterite on undulating plains and rocky hillsides.

Conservation
Melaleuca subfalcata is listed as "not threatened" by the Government of Western Australia Department of Parks and Wildlife.

References

subfalcata
Myrtales of Australia
Plants described in 1847
Endemic flora of Western Australia
Taxa named by Nikolai Turczaninow